Bon Accord was a closed railway station on the Main South railway line in New South Wales, Australia. The station opened in 1891 and closed in 1962. No trace remains of it today.

References

Disused regional railway stations in New South Wales
Railway stations in Australia opened in 1891
Railway stations closed in 1962
Main Southern railway line, New South Wales